The UEFA Fan's Team of the Year is a football award given by UEFA through a poll on its official website. This award started in 2001 and allows users of the organization's website to choose their own eleven players and a coach based on their overall performances in European club football and international competitions.

Selection process 
Until 2011, the writers at the website had constructed a short-list of sixty footballers and coaches who have performed well in European club competitions, domestic competitions and international tournaments for that particular year. Users then cast their vote of a line-up consisting of eleven players (including a goalkeeper, four defenders, four midfielders, and two forwards) and a coach based on who they believed excelled in European football. After the selection is made, the user also has to select one of the players to be the captain of their team.

The format of the vote was changed in 2012 – now users first choose their preferred formation (4–4–2, 3–5–2, 3–4–3, 4–3–3 or 5–3–2), and then choose the relevant number of players for each position. The voters have a choice between 4 goalkeepers, 12 defenders, 12 midfielders and 12 forwards. The voting for best coach was discontinued.

After the votes are cast, they are tallied and the final team is announced on the UEFA website.

Appearance records
The player with the most appearances in the team is Cristiano Ronaldo, having appeared fifteen times. Second is Lionel Messi, having appeared twelve times. Sergio Ramos has the third-most appearances with nine, which is also the record for a defender. The most consecutive appearances in the team is fourteen for Cristiano Ronaldo (2007–2020), followed by Sergio Ramos (2012–2018) and Lionel Messi (2014–2020) with seven each, and Iker Casillas (2007–2012) with six.

The teams with the most player appearances (not including manager appearances) are Real Madrid and Barcelona with 49, followed by Bayern Munich (21) and Juventus (20). Barcelona is the team with the most players selected in a single season, with six players in both 2009 and 2010. The only other teams with more than three players in one season are Bayern Munich (four in 2013 and five in both 2014 and 2020), Liverpool (five in 2019), and Real Madrid (five in both 2017 and 2018 and four in 2003, 2012, 2013, 2014 and 2016).

The manager with the most appearances is José Mourinho, with four appearances (one with Internazionale, two with Porto and one with Chelsea). He is followed by Alex Ferguson, who has two appearances.

Team of the Year 2001 

Coach:  Gérard Houllier:  Liverpool

Source:

Players who played for two teams during the voting year have the club they transferred to during a transfer window listed second.

Team of the Year 2002 

Coach:  Şenol Güneş:  Turkey

Source:

Players who played for two teams during the voting year have the club they transferred to during a transfer window listed second.

Team of the Year 2003 

Coach:  José Mourinho:  Porto

Source:

Players who played for two teams during the voting year have the club they transferred to during a transfer window listed second.

Team of the Year 2004 

Coach:  José Mourinho:  Porto /  Chelsea

Source:

Players who played for two teams during the voting year have the club they transferred to during a transfer window listed second.

Team of the Year 2005 

Coach:  José Mourinho:  Chelsea

Source:

Team of the Year 2006 

Coach:  Frank Rijkaard:  Barcelona

Source:

Players who played for two teams during the voting year have the club they transferred to during a transfer window listed second.

Team of the Year 2007 

Coach:  Alex Ferguson:  Manchester United

Source:

Players who played for two teams during the voting year have the club they transferred to during a transfer window listed second.

Team of the Year 2008 

Coach:  Alex Ferguson:  Manchester United

Source:

Team of the Year 2009 

Coach:  Pep Guardiola:  Barcelona

Source:

Players who played for two teams during the voting year have the club they transferred to during a transfer window listed second.

Team of the Year 2010 

Coach:  José Mourinho:  Internazionale /  Real Madrid

Source:

Players who played for two teams during the voting year have the club they transferred to during a transfer window listed second.

Team of the Year 2011 

Source:

Voting for a coach ended this year.

Team of the Year 2012 

Source:

Players who played for two teams during the voting year have the club they transferred to during a transfer window listed second.

Team of the Year 2013 

Source:

Players who played for two teams during the voting year have the club they transferred to during a transfer window listed second.

Team of the Year 2014 

Source:

Players who played for two teams during the voting year have the club they transferred to during a transfer window listed second.

Team of the Year 2015 

Source:

Team of the Year 2016 

Source:

Team of the Year 2017 

Source:

Team of the Year 2018 

Source:

Team of the Year 2019 

Source:

Team of the Year 2020 

Source:

Most appearances

By player

By coach

By club

By country

UEFA Ultimate Team of the Year 
In November 2015, UEFA published their Ultimate Team of the Year, composed of the 18 players (11 starters and 7 substitutes) with the all-time most appearances in the UEFA Team of the Year, since its inception in 2001.

In November 2017, UEFA published an UEFA all-time XI of the century so far, their second Ultimate Team of the Year, composed of the 11 players with the all-time most appearances in the UEFA Team of the Year, since its inception in 2001.

See also
UEFA Club Footballer of the Year
UEFA Club Football Awards
UEFA Men's Player of the Year Award

References

External links
UEFA Team of the Year uefa.com
List of previous UEFA Team of the Year uefa.com

Team of the Year